Janina Zione Gavankar (born November 29, 1980) is an American actress and musician. She is trained as a pianist, vocalist, orchestral percussionist and majored in theatre at the University of Illinois Chicago. Her roles include Eva “Papi” Torres on Showtime’s The L Word, Shiva on The League, Leigh Turner on The Gates, Luna Garza on HBO's True Blood, McKenna Hall on The CW's Arrow and Diana Thomas on FOX's Sleepy Hollow. In marketing, she also played "Ms. Dewey", a personified search engine and virtual assistant for Microsoft.

Early life
Gavankar was born in Joliet, Illinois to Ganesh "Peter" Gavankar, an engineer from Mumbai, who first travelled to the US to pursue a master's degree, and Shan Demohra "Mohra" Gavankar, of 
half-Indian and half-Dutch descent, from Pune, who also emigrated there from India.

Career
Gavankar has acted in theatre, film, television, and online. Her most notable roles include Iden Versio, a canon Star Wars character and the protagonist of Star Wars: Battlefront II; shapeshifter Luna Garza in True Blood, Papi in The L Word; Ms. Dewey, the personification of a Microsoft live search engine; and Shiva, the namesake of the sought after trophy on The League.  She regularly appears in Funny or Die shorts.

In 2006 she joined the cast of The L Word as a series regular, and shot all of the clips used for Ms. Dewey.  In 2007, she landed a lead in CW pilot Dash 4 Cash. In 2008, Gavankar appeared in the TV series Stargate Atlantis, Grey's Anatomy, NCIS, My Boys, and Factory. In 2009, she appeared in the TV shows The Cleaner, Dollhouse, Three Rivers, and The League, as well as indie movies Men, Interrupted, Indian Gangster, and Quantum Quest: A Cassini Space Odyssey. Gavankar played the voice of Nikki in Quantum Quest. She landed a lead role in The Gates, since cancelled, on ABC. She appears on CW's Arrow as a vice squad police officer and brief girlfriend to Oliver Queen.

Gavankar is an admitted gamer and has appeared on, as well as co-hosted, G4 TV's Attack of the Show!, Epileptic Gaming's Up All Night, where she helped review Rock Band, Burnout Paradise, and Army of Two.

In 2011 Gavankar became a series regular in HBO's True Blood as a public school teacher and shapeshifter, Luna Garza, who gets romantically involved with one of the main characters of the series.

Her indie movie, Satellite of Love, premiered at the Dallas International Film Festival in 2012, and her 2012 indie I'm Afraid of Virginia Wolf is currently in post-production. On December 20, 2012, Gavankar was the last person interviewed for the now cancelled Attack of the Show! which aired on G4 TV.

On August 3, 2013, Gavankar landed a role as a witch named Qetsiyah in the fifth season of The Vampire Diaries. She guest starred in the third season of Husbands.

In 2014, she starred as Amita in the  video game, Far Cry 4. She also played Detective Meredith Bose on The Mysteries of Laura from 2014 to 2016.

She starred as Iden Versio, the main character in the campaign mode of the 2017 Electronic Arts video game Star Wars Battlefront II.

In 2018, she was in two films. Blindspotting premiered at the Sundance Film Festival, and The Vanishing of Sidney Hall was distributed by A24.

In late 2019 Gavankar had a supporting role in the new Apple TV+ series The Morning Show.

Starting in 2021, Gavankar had a starring role as the antagonist in seasons 2 & 3 of the ABC hit show Big Sky playing the sibling in a mafia family.

Music
Gavankar returned to music with a cover of Kanye West's "Love Lockdown". Gavankar's former all female singing group, Endera, was signed to Cash Money Records Universal Records.

She collaborated on a project for a song called "Tell Me What" in India with Pratichee Mohapatra of Viva, Deep, and Navraaz. She has had songs licensed to movies and television, and has sung and played marimba on film scores. Gavankar was featured in Russian artist Ella Leya's music video for "Wish I Could", in the music video by San Francisco-based band Recliner for their single "Float Away", as well as the music video for Manu Narayan's band Darunam.

In August 2012, she released the single for her upcoming EP, entitled Waiting for Godot, and in November, Billboard premiered the official music video. It went on to win numerous film festival awards.

While in high school, Gavankar auditioned for the front ensemble of the Phantom Regiment Drum and Bugle Corps of Rockford, Illinois. Before hearing whether she had made the corps, she was accepted for the Yale School of Drama's summer camp, and went there. "I fell in love with drum corps when I was 13 years old", Gavankar has stated, and remains a strong fan of the activity. When she heard the Martin Garrix/Usher collaboration, "Don't Look Down", she had the idea of performing it as marching music. With assistance from Drum Corps International, she contacted the Jersey Surf Drum and Bugle Corps and arranger Colin Bell. She went into the studios in New York with fifty members of Jersey Surf and recorded the music video "Don't Look Down- #JustAddDrumCorps Edition" that was released in April 2015.

On May 20, 2015, Gavankar performed a percussion duet at Carnegie Hall with Questlove for the Best Buddies charity benefit.

Technology
Gavankar was the first actress to use Twitter, signing up on  Richard Branson's computer on Necker Island in 2006.

Gavankar was the personification of Microsoft's interactive search engine Ms. Dewey.

In 2011 she created a free template for actors and artists to help them control their online presence and in 2012, spoke at the Suits and Spooks Conference about how she discovered a solution for data challenges faced by actors through the use of open source tools.

In 2017, she launched a private discussion forum for members of the games industry.

In 2018, she produced the first narrative film to use the ARRI Alexa LF.

Gavankar is a first round investor in ClassPass.

Awards 
In 2008, Gavankar was nominated for an Asian Excellence Award. In 2012, Gavankar received the Gravity Summit Award for Excellence in Social Media.

Filmography

Film

Television

Video games

Audiobooks

Crew work

References

External links

 
 Janina Gavankar profile, Lesbicanarias.es (in Spanish)
 Interview, Rediff.com (September 7, 2007)
 Interview, forbes.com (November 2012)

1980 births
21st-century American actresses
Actors from Joliet, Illinois
Actresses from Illinois
American actresses of Indian descent
American people of Marathi descent
American film actresses
American people of Dutch descent
American television actresses
American video game actresses
American voice actresses
Living people
Musicians from Joliet, Illinois
University of Illinois Chicago alumni